Terrence Brooks (born March 2, 1992) is an American football safety who is a free agent. He was drafted by the Baltimore Ravens in the third round of the 2014 NFL Draft. He played college football at Florida State.

High school career
A native of Dunnellon, Florida, Brooks attended Dunnellon High School where he rushed for 500 yards and recorded 53 tackles, six interceptions, and three pass breakups during his junior season.

Considered a three-star recruit by ESPN.com, Brooks was listed as the No. 21 cornerback prospect of his class. He accepted a scholarship offer from Florida State over offers from Mississippi and South Florida.

College career
As a senior in 2013, Brooks was a first-team All-ACC selection and was an All-American by CBSSports.com.

Professional career

The Baltimore Ravens selected Brooks in the third round (79th overall) of the 2014 NFL Draft.

Baltimore Ravens

On May 30, 2014, he was signed by the Ravens to a four-year contract  On December 16, 2014, Brooks was placed on injured reserve, ending his rookie campaign.
On September 3, 2016, he was released by the Ravens.

Philadelphia Eagles
On September 4, 2016, Brooks was claimed off waivers by the Philadelphia Eagles.

New York Jets
On August 27, 2017, Brooks was traded to the New York Jets in exchange for cornerback Dexter McDougle. In Week 3, Brooks recorded two interceptions, one off quarterback Jay Cutler and the other off Matt Haack, and three passes defensed, helping the Jets earn their first win in a 20–6 victory over the Miami Dolphins, earning him AFC Defensive Player of the Week.

On March 14, 2018, Brooks signed a two-year contract extension with the Jets.

On February 19, 2019, the Jets declined the option on Brooks' contract, making him a free agent at the start of the new league year.

New England Patriots 

On March 14, 2019, Brooks signed a two-year contract with the New England Patriots.
In Week 7 against his former team, the New York Jets, Brooks recorded his first interception of the season off Sam Darnold in the 33-0 win.

Houston Texans
On March 23, 2021, Brooks signed a one-year contract with the Houston Texans. He was placed on injured reserve on October 21, 2021 with a lung contusion. He was activated on November 20.

On March 29, 2022, Brooks re-signed with the Texans. He was released on August 30, 2022.

References

External links
 
 Florida State Seminoles bio

1992 births
Living people
American football cornerbacks
American football safeties
Baltimore Ravens players
Florida State Seminoles football players
Houston Texans players
New England Patriots players
New York Jets players
People from Dunnellon, Florida
Philadelphia Eagles players
Players of American football from Florida